Routt Catholic High School is a private, Roman Catholic high school in Jacksonville, Illinois.  It is located in the Roman Catholic Diocese of Springfield in Illinois.

Background
Routt High School was founded in 1902 through the inspiration of Rev. Dean John W. Crowe, the encouragement of Fr. Francis Formaz, and the generosity of the Routt family. Celebrating its 100-year anniversary in 2002, Routt continues to provide an excellent education for students of all faiths .

Notes and References

External links
 School website

Catholic secondary schools in Illinois
Roman Catholic Diocese of Springfield in Illinois
Schools in Morgan County, Illinois
Educational institutions established in 1902
Jacksonville, Illinois
1902 establishments in Illinois